The Chichele Professorships are statutory professorships at the University of Oxford named in honour of Henry Chichele (also spelt Chicheley or Checheley, although the spelling of the academic position is consistently "Chichele"), an Archbishop of Canterbury and founder of All Souls College, Oxford. Fellowship of that college has accompanied the award of a Chichele chair since 1870.

Following the work of the 1850 Commission to examine the organization of the university, All Souls College suppressed ten of its fellowships to create the funds to establish the first two Chichele professorships: The Chichele Professor of International Law and Diplomacy, established in 1859 and first held by Mountague Bernard, and the Chichele Professor of Modern History, first held by Montagu Burrows.

The military history chair was originally established in 1909 as the Chichele Professorship of Military History. In 1923, the History Faculty Board first recommended that the name of the chair be changed to the history of war, but this recommendation was not implemented until 1946.

Probably the best known former Chichele Professor is Sir Isaiah Berlin. Perhaps the best known former professor of the history of war was Cyril Falls.

Professorships 
There are currently Chichele Professorships in five different subjects:
 Chichele Professor of Economic History, established 1931
 Chichele Professor of the History of War, established 1909
 Chichele Professor of Public International Law, established 1859
 Chichele Professor of Social and Political Theory, established 1944
 Chichele Professor of Medieval History, established 1862 as Modern History renamed in 1984

Holders

Economic history
 George Norman Clark, 1931
 W. K. Hancock, 1944
 John Habakkuk, 1950–1967
 Peter Mathias, 1969–1987
 Charles Feinstein, 1989–
 Avner Offer, 2000–2011
 Kevin O'Rourke, 2011–2019
Sheilagh Ogilvie, 2020–

History of war
 Spenser Wilkinson, 1909–1923
 Sir Ernest Swinton, 1925–1939

The Chair was vacant from 1939 to 1943 and suspended between 1943 and 1946, when it was renamed from of Military History

 Cyril Falls, 1946–1953
 N. H. Gibbs, 1953–1977
 Michael Howard, 1977–1980 
 Robert O'Neill, 1987–2000
 Sir Hew Strachan, 2001–2015
 Peter H. Wilson, 2015–present

Public international law
 Mountague Bernard, 1859–1870
 Thomas Erskine Holland, 1874–
 Sir Henry Erle Richards, 1911–
 James Leslie Brierly, 1922– 
 Sir Humphrey Waldock, 1947–
 D. P. O'Connell, 1972–1979
 Ian Brownlie, 1980–1999
 Vaughan Lowe, 1999–2012
 Catherine Redgwell, 2012–

Social and political theory
 G. D. H. Cole, 1944–1957
 Sir Isaiah Berlin, 1957–1967
 John Plamenatz, 1967–1975
 Charles Taylor, 1976–1981
 G. A. Cohen, 1985–2008
 Jeremy Waldron, 2010–2014
 Amia Srinivasan, 2020–

Modern history
 Montagu Burrows, 1862–1905
 Sir Charles Oman, 1905–1946
 Keith Feiling, 1946–1950
 E. F. Jacob, 1950–1961
 R. W. Southern, 1961–1969
 Geoffrey Barraclough, 1970–1973
 J. M. Wallace-Hadrill, 1974–1983

Medieval history
 Karl Joseph Leyser, 1984–1988
 George Arthur Holmes, 1989–1995
 Sir Rees Davies, 1995–2005
 Christopher Wickham, 2005–2016
 Julia Smith, 2016–

See also
List of professorships at the University of Oxford

References

 Owen, Dorothy M. "The Chichele Professorship of Modern History, 1862," Historical Research (1961) 34#90 pp 217–220, DOI: 10.1111/j.1468-2281.1961.tb02098.x
 Soffer, Reba. "Nation, Duty, Character and Confidence: History at Oxford, 1850–1914," Historical Journal (1987) 30#1 pp. 77–104 in JSTOR

Professorships at the University of Oxford